Damaeidae Berlese (1896) is a family of mites. Alternative names for the family include Belbidae Willmann (1931), and Belbodamaeidae Bulanova-Zachvatkina (1967) or Hungarobelbidae (1996). They had been previously considered to be distinct families.

Species of the family are extant in Eurasia and Northern America. Related species exist in New Zealand and South America.

Behaviour
Most species of the family live in plant litter, mosses, decaying woods and organic soil layers. The family is composed of fungivores. They have an important role in regulation of the density of fungi that is harmful for plants.

List of genera

The following genera are part of this family:

References

Further reading

External links

Damaeidae Species Listing in Joel Hallan's Biology Catalog by Dr. Heinrich Schatz
Damaeidae Berlese, 1896 at ITIS
Damaeidae at the National Center for Biotechnology Information

Sarcoptiformes
Acari families